The Grief of Stones is a fantasy novel written by the American author Sarah Monette under the pseudonym Katherine Addison, set in the same world as her award-winning earlier novel The Goblin Emperor. The book was first published in hardcover and ebook by Tor Books in June 2022.

References

2022 American novels
American fantasy novels
2022 fantasy novels
Tor Books books